Taulant Çerçizi (born 26 March 1981) is an Albanian retired football player.

External links
 

1981 births
Living people
Association football midfielders
Albanian footballers
Flamurtari Vlorë players
FK Dinamo Tirana players
KF Apolonia Fier players
KF Himara players